Events in the year 1843 in Mexico.

Incumbents 
President: 
 until March 4: Nicolás Bravo 
 March 4 – October 4: Antonio López de Santa Anna
 starting October 4: Valentín Canalizo

Governors
 Aguascalientes: Mariano Chico Navarro
 Chiapas: Ignacio Barberena
 Chihuahua: 
 Coahuila: Francisco Mejía/José Juan Sánchez Estrada
 Durango:  
 Guanajuato: 
 Guerrero: 
 Jalisco: Mariano Paredes y Arrillaga/José María Jarero/José Antonio Mozo
 State of Mexico:  
 Michoacán: 
 Nuevo León: Manuel María de Llano
 Oaxaca: 
 Puebla: 
 Querétaro: Julián Juvera 
 San Luis Potosí: 
 Sinaloa: 
 Sonora: 
 Tabasco: 
 Tamaulipas: Francisco Vital Fernandez/Jose Ignacio Gutierrez/Juan Nepomuceno Cortina	 
 Veracruz: 
 Yucatán: Miguel Barbachano
 Zacatecas:

Events
 April 30 – May 16 – Naval Battle of Campeche: Naval Battle between the Mexican Navy versus the Texas Navy and the Yucatán Navy. The battle featured the most advanced warships of its day.
 August 23 – President Antonio López de Santa Anna announced that the annexation of Texas by the United States would be considered an act of war by Mexico.

Notable deaths
March 21 — Guadalupe Victoria, 1st President of Mexico (b. 1786)

Notes

 
Years of the 19th century in Mexico
Mexico
Mexico
1840s in Mexico